Mathews Mar Barnabas (9 August 1924 – 9 December 2012) was a Metropolitan of the Malankara Orthodox Syrian Church.

Early life
Mathews Mar Barnabas was born as one of a set of twins to Kuruvilla and Mariamma, a couple of the Kidangethu Thompra family in Kallarackaparampil house at Valayanchirangara. In his childhood, he was called Mathukutty. At the age of seven, Mathukutty made the decision to become a monk and started to consume vegetarian food. Mathukutty and his twin brother used to stay in the Gathsemon Dayara monastery at Piramadam, near Muvattupuzha during their vacation and experienced the monastic life under the guidance of their uncle Fr K.P. Paulose.

Mathukutty's grandfather and uncle were Orthodox priests.

Education
He studied Biology from Madras Christian College and did his masters in Botany in Osmania University while serving the parish in Secunderabad. He began his theological studies under the guidance of his uncle Fr K. P. Paulose. In 1949 he joined the Orthodox Theological Seminary as a special student and studied Syriac for two years. While he was the vicar of the Calcutta parish, he studied in the Bishop's College, Calcutta and earned his B. D. degree from the Serampore University as an external student.

Career
Catholicos Baselios Geevarghese II ordained him as a deacon in 1943 at Mathukutty's home parish: St Peter and St Paul Malankara Orthodox Syrian Church, Valayanchirangara, Kerala, India. In 1951, Metropolitan Augen Mar Thimotheos ordained the man to the priesthood.

As a deacon, he was a teacher at Kurppumpady M.G. M. High School in 1947. He taught there for two years and continued to teach for another two years at the MD Seminary High School, Kottayam, until he was ordained to priesthood. He also was a lecturer in the Orthodox Theological Seminary at Kottayam from 1967 to 1972. During this period, he was the resident faculty member at the seminary and full-time warden. He also served as chaplain in the Kolenchery Medical Mission Hospital from 1972-1978.

Ordination as Metropolitan
Malankara Association, held in 1977, elected Fr K. K. Mathews as a metropolitan of the church. On 15 May 1978, Baselios Mar Thoma Mathews I consecrated him as bishop at Pazhanji Church, with the ecclesiastical title Mathews Mar Barnabas, and appointed him as assistant bishop of the Angamaly and Kottayam Dioceses. In 1982 he was appointed as the metropolitan of the newly formed Idukki Diocese. In 1992/93, Mathews Mar Barnabas was appointed as the diocesan metropolitan of the undivided American Diocese.

Retirement
On 18 January 2011, the Catholicos of The East and Malankara Metropolitan, Baselius Mar Thoma Paulose II, accepted Mathews Mar Barnabas' request to be relieved from administrative responsibilities as diocesan metropolitan of the Northeast American Diocese. Mathews Mar Barnabas left the United States on 25 May 2011.

Death
Mathews Mar Barnabas was admitted to Pushpagiri Hospital, Thiruvilla (Kerala), for a pain-related issue. He died at around 3:15 AM (Indian Standard Time) on 9 December 2012, and was buried at St Peter's and St Paul's Malankara Orthodox Syrian Church, Valayanchirangara, Perumbavoor, Kerala, India.

See also
 Malankara Orthodox Syrian Church

References

External links
 Official website of Malankara Orthodox Syrian church
 www.neamericandiocese.org
 Indian Orthodox Herald
  www.stgregoriosphila.org
 Sacrament of the Anointing of the Sick given to His Excellency Mar Barnabas

Malankara Orthodox Syrian Church bishops
Oriental Orthodoxy in the United States
Oriental Orthodoxy in Canada
1924 births
2012 deaths
20th-century Oriental Orthodox archbishops
21st-century Oriental Orthodox archbishops